Bassingbourne Gawdy (1535 – 20 January 1590), of West Harling, Norfolk, was an English landowner, magistrate and Member of Parliament (MP).

He was the second son of Thomas Gawdy (d.1556) of Shotesham and Redenhall, Norfolk, by his father's first wife, Anne, daughter and coheiress of John Bassingbourne of Woodhall, Hatfield, Hertfordshire. He was educated at Trinity Hall, Cambridge, matriculating in 1545, and trained in the law at the Inner Temple.

In 1557 Bassingbourne was investigated for selling wood at Middleton Hall. On 26 September 1558 Gawdy married Anne Wotten. Through her, Bassingbourne obtained property in West Harling.

He was appointed a Justice of the Peace for Suffolk from c. 1573 and for Norfolk from c. 1583, and was High Sheriff of Norfolk for 1578–79. In 1584 he was elected an MP for Eye, Suffolk.

Bassingbourne Gawdy was buried on 25 January 1589/90 at West Harling.

Marriages 

He married twice.

According to the Visitations, his first wife was Anne (1536–1587), the daughter of John Wootton of North Tuddenham, Norfolk, the great-niece of Henry Wotton, and the widow both of Thomas Woodhouse of Hickling, Norfolk (son of Sir William Woodhouse), and of Henry Reppes of Mendham, Suffolk, the widower of Bess Holland. The two were married on 26 September 1558 at Redenhall with Harleston and Wortwell. She was buried at West Harling on 9 June 1587. By this marriage, Gawdy had two sons:
 Bassingbourne Gawdy, who married Anne, daughter and heiress of Sir Charles Framlingham, of Crow's Hall, Debenham, Suffolk. He was knighted as Sir Bassingbourne Gawdy in 1597.
 Philip Gawdy (1562–1617). In 1591 he joined the Revenge under Sir Richard Grenville, Knight, and was captured at the Battle of Flores, but was redeemed and lived afterwards at West Harling. Philip's letters are held by the British Library
His second wife was Margaret, daughter of Eustace Sulyard, and widow of Thomas Darcy of Tolleshunt D'Arcy, Essex. They married in December 1588: she died within two years, and was buried on 15 August 1590.

Portrait 
His portrait was painted by Hans Eworth.

Lionel Cust, in his article The Painter HE (‘ Hans Eworth.’) in a Volume of the Walpole Society gives the following description of two portraits of Bassingbourne Gawdy and his wife:1557 BASSINGBORNE GAWDY and ANNE WOOTTON his wife.

Vertue (Brit. Mus. Add. MS. 23070, fo. 75) notes: 'Amongst old paintings at Bow left by Mr. Le Neve Norroy at his house there. Bassingborne Gawdy Esq. on board, small life, ætatis 22. The mark of the painter HE. 1557 ... his wife ætat 20. HE. the mark of the Painter also. These two pictures, as they are not half so big as the life, are drawn with a pretty good spirit and firm manner, the colouring faded.'

Bassingborne Gawdy of Mendham, Norfolk, son of Thomas Gawdy of Redenhall, Norfolk, Serjeant-at-law, and Anne Bassingborne his wife, married in 1558 Anne, daughter of John Wootton of Tudenham and Elizabeth Bardwell his wife, and grand-daughter of John Wootton of Tudenham, whose second wife was Mary Nevill, Baroness Dacre (see above). Anne Wootton had been previously married, first to Thomas Wodehouse, and secondly to Henry Repps.Hope Walker and Kate Emerson suggest that this portrait of Anne Wootton may be that of an Unknown Lady, Formerly Lady Anne Penruddocke. The portrait's former identification as Anne Penruddocke was rejected by Hope Walker in 2010.

References

1590 deaths
Alumni of Trinity Hall, Cambridge
Members of the Inner Temple
People from Harling, Norfolk
English MPs 1584–1585
English justices of the peace
High Sheriffs of Norfolk
1535 births